A vaccine vial monitor (VVM) is a thermochromic label put on vials containing vaccines which gives a visual indication of whether the vaccine has been kept at a temperature which preserves its potency.  The labels were designed in response to the problem of delivering vaccines to developing countries where the cold chain is difficult to preserve, and where formerly vaccines were being rendered inactive and administered ineffectively due to their having been denatured by exposure to ambient temperature.

History
When international vaccine care standards were being designed in the 1970s, the manuals typically generalized from the needs of care for the oral polio vaccine since that was the most delicate vaccine in wide use.

In the 1970s PATH began working with the WHO to develop a system for identifying vaccines which had expired from improper storage.  In 1996 the vaccine vial monitor was first used in a vaccine project, and by the next year it was widely accepted for use on many vaccine projects.

In 2007 in Geneva the World Health Organization hosted a commemoration of the 10-year anniversary of the introduction of VVMs. In 2007 PATH won a Tech Award for the development of the VVM.

Use
The vaccine vial monitor consists of a heat sensitive square within a circle.  If the monitor is exposed to heat it changes color with time and with increasing speed in hotter conditions.  If the square becomes the same color as the circle or becomes darker than the circle, then the vaccine contained in the vial is damaged and the vial should be discarded.

Studies have shown that health workers without proper training sometimes do not understand what a VVM is or how it works.  A 2007 study in urban areas of Valsad in India showed that vaccine administrators were unaware of the purpose of the monitors.

Commonly monitored vaccines
The vaccine vial monitor is intended for use on vaccines which may travel outside of the cold chain, but its use on certain vaccines has had an especially notable impact.

Hepatitis B
Manufacturers recommend that hepatitis B vaccines be stored at 2-8 °C, but the vaccines actually tolerate ambient and even high temperatures for some amount of time.  The use of vaccine vial monitors has helped health workers remain confident in vaccines being stored outside the cold chain.

Polio vaccine
The World Health Organization has described VVMs as crucial in the spread of polio vaccination programs.

Comparable technology
Electronic time–temperature indicators can detect all temperature changes, including issues of freezing vaccines which heat-detecting VVMs would not detect.

References

External links
 project page at PATH
 World Health Organization page on VVMs

Vaccination
Medical equipment